Serge Sandberg (1879–1981) was a French film producer. Born in Kaunas, then part of the Russian Empire, he emigrated to France in 1900 and initially found work with Pathe. He later went into production for himself, working for Eclair. In 1921 he and his business partner Louis Nalpas established their own Victorine Studios in Nice. In the 1930s he produced several of the hit comedies directed by and starring Sacha Guitry.

He was also involved in the re-establishment of the Pasdeloup Orchestra after the First World War.

Selected filmography
 Mathias Sandorf (1921)
 A Foolish Maiden (1929)
 Napoleon at Saint Helena (1929)
 Confessions of a Cheat (1936)
 Let's Make a Dream (1936)
 The New Testament (1936)
 My Father Was Right (1936)
 The Pearls of the Crown (1937)
 Désiré (1937)

References

Bibliography
 Barton, Ruth. Rex Ingram: Visionary Director of the Silent Screen. University Press of Kentucky, 2014.

External links

1879 births
1981 deaths
French film producers
French centenarians
Men centenarians
Emigrants from the Russian Empire to France